Psychic Kids: Children of the Paranormal  is a paranormal television series broadcast on the A&E television network. Hosted by Chip Coffey, an American psychic investigator, with licensed therapist Edy Nathan, "sensitive" Chris Fleming, and medium Kim Russo, the show brings together children who report having psychic abilities with adult psychic/mediums, with the stated purpose of "show[ing] them how to harness their abilities and, ultimately, [showing] them that they're not alone in this world". Later episodes feature content in correlation with another A&E paranormal series Coffey has appeared on, Paranormal State, with Ryan Buell.
 
The series premiered on June 16, 2008 and ran to November 28, 2010.

A&E later aired an episode of Biographies called "Psychic Children" about children and young people with the same alleged abilities described in the show (e.g. crystal children).

On June 26, 2019, A&E announced the revival of Psychic Kids. The series premiered on August 21, 2019.

The Kids
The kids featured in the show allegedly possess varying psychic abilities which include precognition, clairvoyance, talking with the dead, sensing illnesses and diseases, psychometry and retrocognition. 
Typically the kids seen in the shows are being haunted by spirits and need help to control their abilities.

Kids from the series include Peri Zarrella, Ryan Michaels, Alex Curcio and Nick Barger.

Original Series
The original series premiered on June 16, 2008. A second season premiered on December 15, 2009, and the third and final season premiered on October 17, 2010.

Season 1 (2008)

Season 2 (2009-10)

Season 3 (2010)

Reboot
A series reboot premiered on August 21, 2019. The new series shows kids from the original series (now adults) returning to help a new generation of psychic children.

Returning psychics include Peri Zarrella, Ryan Michaels, Alex Curcio and Nick Barger.

Season 1 (2019)

Reception
One critic thought Psychic Kids was exploiting children, while some others felt that the psychic mentors in the show handled the situation carefully.

References

External links
Official Website

2008 American television series debuts
A&E (TV network) original programming
Paranormal television
English-language television shows
American television series revived after cancellation